Roland So (born 22 June 1966) is a Filipino former professional tennis player.

Tennis career
So represented the Philippines in eight Davis Cup ties between 1986 and 1993, winning six singles and two doubles rubbers. One of his singles wins came against Wimbledon quarter-finalist Shuzo Matsuoka of Japan.

While competing on the professional tour, So reached a career high singles ranking of 367 in the world, featuring in the qualifying draws of both the Australian Open and US Open tournaments. 

So played college tennis for Louisiana State University (LSU), where he earned All-American honors in 1989.

At the 1991 Southeast Asian Games he partnered with LSU teammate Felix Barrientos to win a doubles gold medal for the Philippines. He was also a two-time singles medalist at the Southeast Asian Games, which included a silver medal in 1993, behind Indonesia's Suwandi Suwandi.

References

External links
 
 
 

1966 births
Living people
Filipino male tennis players
LSU Tigers tennis players
Southeast Asian Games medalists in tennis
Competitors at the 1991 Southeast Asian Games
Competitors at the 1993 Southeast Asian Games
Southeast Asian Games gold medalists for the Philippines
Southeast Asian Games silver medalists for the Philippines
Southeast Asian Games bronze medalists for the Philippines